Sino is the Latin Grammy winning sixth studio album by Mexican band Café Tacuba, released on October 9, 2007 in Mexico, Latin America and the United States. The band has once again worked with award-winning Argentine music producer Gustavo Santaolalla.

Four singles spawned off the album- "Volver a Comenzar", "Esta Vez", "Vámonos", and "Quiero Ver".

The full album leaked onto the internet on October 6, 2007.

On September 10, 2008, Café Tacvba became the leading nominee at the Latin Grammy Awards of 2008 with a total of six nominations: Album of the Year and Alternative Music Album, for Sino. The lead single "Volver a Comenzar" was shortlisted for Record of the Year and Best Alternative Song. The second single "Esta Vez" received nominations for Best Rock Song and Song of the Year.  The band took the record for most Latin Grammys won in one night.

"Volver a Comenzar" is featured prominently in the video game LittleBigPlanet.

Reception

— The New York Times

— Los Angeles Times

In Mexico, the album was certified Gold by Asociación Mexicana de Productores de Fonogramas y Videogramas (AMPROFON) for selling 30,000 units. In addition, a pre-loaded bundle of audio and video tracks including "Volver a Comenzar", "Esta Vez", "Y Es Que...", "Vámonos" and "Quiero Ver" was certified Gold  for selling an additional 50,000 units.

Track listing

Personnel
Ixaya Mazatzin Tleyotl aka. Ixxi Xoo/ Cone Cahuitl (Rubén Albarrán) – vocals (lead vocals on all tracks except 2, 3, 7 and 12; co-lead vocals on 13 and 14), guitar
Emmanuel Del Real – Keyboards, acoustic guitar, piano, programming, vocals (lead vocals on track 3 and 7; co-lead vocals on 13 and 14), melodeon 
Joselo Rangel – Electric guitar, acoustic guitar, vocals (lead vocals on track 2). 
Quique Rangel – Bass guitar, electric upright bass, vocals (lead vocals on track 12).
Additional Musicians:
Victor Indrizzo - Acoustic and Mic’d Drums

Certifications

References

2007 albums
Café Tacuba albums
Albums produced by Gustavo Santaolalla